Henry Lovell (June 13, 1828 – December 4, 1907) was a Canadian politician.
Born in Barnston, Stanstead County, Lower Canada, the son of William Lovell and Mary Hanson, Lovell was a farmer and merchant. He moved to Coaticook, Quebec in 1867. He was a municipal councilor in Coaticook from 1876 to 1885 and again from 1888 to 1891. He was mayor from 1874 to 1875 and from 1886 to 1887. He was elected to the Legislative Assembly of Quebec in 1878 for the riding of Stanstead. A Quebec Liberal, he was defeated in 1881 and 1886. He was elected to the House of Commons of Canada for Stanstead in 1900. A Liberal, he was re-elected in 1904. He died while in office in 1907. His son, Charles Henry Lovell, was elected in the 1908 by-election following the death of his father. His other son, Moodie Brock Lovell, was a Member of the Legislative Assembly of Quebec.

Electoral record

References
 
 

1828 births
1907 deaths
Liberal Party of Canada MPs
Mayors of places in Quebec
Members of the House of Commons of Canada from Quebec
Quebec Liberal Party MNAs